Colour My World or Color My World may refer to:

"Colour My World" (Petula Clark song), 1966 composition by English songwriters Tony Hatch and Jackie Trent
Colour My World (album), 1967 album release by Petula Clark
"Colour My World" (Chicago song), 1970 composition by American musician James Pankow, founding member of rock band Chicago; lead vocal by Terry Kath; flute solo by Walter Parazaider
Colour My World (Westlife song), 2005 song by Westlife from Face to Face (Westlife album)
Colour My World, a set of four firearms used by the titular character in Bayonetta 3.